"Even If" is an up-tempo soul-type song by Andy Abraham, the 's entry for the Eurovision Song Contest 2008, which took place in Belgrade, Serbia. It was written by Abraham, Paul Wilson and Andy Watkins, and was released on 19 May 2008. The song finished in joint last place at 23rd, with 14 points.

The single reached #67 on the UK Singles Chart.

The song was succeeded as British representative at the 2009 contest by Jade Ewen with "It's My Time". The UK's 2009 performance was a significant improvement on 2008's last-place finish, with Jade Ewen coming 5th.

Charts

Track listing 
 "Even If" (radio edit)
 "Even If" (album version)
 "Even If" (Manhattan Clique Remix, Radio Edit)
 "Even If" (karaoke version)
 "Even If" (music video; bonus)

References

External links 

Even If – Diggiloo Thrush

2008 singles
Eurovision songs of 2008
Eurovision songs of the United Kingdom
2008 songs
Song recordings produced by Absolute (production team)
Songs written by Andy Watkins
Songs written by Paul Wilson (songwriter)